Dipodium fevrellii is an orchid species that is endemic to Sulawesi in Indonesia. The species was formally described in 1933 by Dutch botanist Johannes Jacobus Smith.

References

External links 

fevrellii
Orchids of Indonesia
Plants described in 1933